Trigonaphera bocageana is a species of sea snail, a marine gastropod mollusk in the family Cancellariidae, the nutmeg snails.

Description
The length of the shell attains .

Distribution
This marine species occurs off China, Japan, Taiwan and the Philippines

References

External links
 Crosse H. & Debeaux O. (1863). Diagnoses d'espèces nouvelles du nord de la Chine. Journal de Conchyliologie. 11: 77-79

Cancellariidae
Gastropods described in 1863